Hermenegildo Galeana  is a town and seat of Galeana Municipality, in the northern Mexican state of Chihuahua.  As of 2010, the town had a population of 926.

It is named after Hermenegildo Galeana.

References

Populated places in Chihuahua (state)